Niobrara may refer to:
 Niobrara, Nebraska
 Niobrara County, Wyoming
 Niobrara River
 Niobrara National Scenic River
 Niobrara Formation, a geological unit
 Niobrara Township, Knox County, Nebraska